The Miss Arizona's Teen competition is the pageant that selects the representative for the U.S. state of Arizona in the Miss America's Teen pageant.

Saray Ringenbach of Maricopa was crowned Miss Arizona's Outstanding Teen on June 25, 2022 at the Madison Center of the Arts in Phoenix, Arizona. She competed for the title of Miss America's Outstanding Teen 2023 at the Hyatt Regency Dallas in Dallas, Texas on August 12, 2022 where she placed in the Top 11.

In January of 2023, the official name of the pageant was changed from Miss Arizona’s Outstanding Teen, to Miss Arizona’s Teen, in accordance with the national pageant.

Results summary
The year in parentheses indicates the year of the Miss America's Teen competition the award/placement was garnered.

Placements
 1st runner-up: Katelyn Cai (2020)
 3rd runners-up: Jessi Gradillas (2016)
 Top 10: Adrienne Nurss (2006)
 Top 11: Saray Ringenbach (2023)

Awards

Preliminary awards
 Preliminary Evening Wear/On Stage Question: Jessi Gradillas (2016), Katelyn Cai (2020)
 Preliminary Talent: Jessi Gradillas (2016)

Other awards
 Outstanding Achievement in Academic Life: Katelyn Cai (2020)
 Top 5 Interview: Katelyn Cai (2020)
 Teens in Action Award Winners: Kate Lynn Blair (2022)
 Teens in Action Award Finalists: Ashlyn Thompson (2019)

Winners

References

External links
 Official website

Arizona
Arizona culture
Women in Arizona
Annual events in Arizona
Chandler, Arizona
Events in Maricopa County, Arizona